Amity Township is a civil township in Bottineau County in the U.S. state of North Dakota. As of the 2000 census, its population was 35.

Geography
Amity Township is located in survey township 161N, Range 75W.

History
Amity Township was organized in 1910 from Amity School Township.

References

Townships in Bottineau County, North Dakota
Populated places established in 1910
Townships in North Dakota